Nemacheilus yingjiangensis is a species of ray-finned fish in the genus Nemacheilus, although some authorities place it in the genus Schistura. The species has only been recorded from the Daying River, a tributary of the Irrawaddy River in Yingjiang County, Yunnan Province, China.

Footnotes 
 

yingjiangensis
Cyprinid fish of Asia
Endemic fauna of China
Freshwater fish of China
Fish described in 1982
Taxobox binomials not recognized by IUCN